The eleventh series of Warsaw Shore, a Polish television programme based in Warsaw, Poland was announced on 14 January 2019., and began airing on 24 March 2019. Ahead of the series it was announced that four new cast members had joined the series, including Anastasiya Yandaltsava, Damian Graf, Ewa Piekut and Kasjusz "Don Kasjo" Życiński. Damian Graf previously appeared on the second series of Ex on the Beach Poland. However, Anastasiya, Ewa and Kasjusz "Don Kasjo" previously appeared on the fourth series of the show. It will also be the first series not to include Marcin "Brzydal" Maruszak after he quit the show. The series also featured the brief return of Aleksandra Smoleń.

Cast 
 Aleksandra Smoleń (Episodes 8–9)
 Anastasiya Yandaltsava
 Klaudia "Czaja" Czajkowska (Episodes 2–13)
 Damian "Dzik" Graf
 Damian "Stifler" Zduńczyk
 Ewa Piekut
 Ewelina Kubiak
 Kasjusz "Don Kasjo" Życiński
 Klaudia Stec
 Anna "Mała" Aleksandrzak
 Patryk Spiker
 Piotr Polak

Duration of cast

Notes 

 Key:  = "Cast member" is featured in this episode.
 Key:  = "Cast member" arrives in the house.
 Key:  = "Cast member" returns to the house.
 Key:  = "Cast member" leaves the series.
 Key:  = "Cast member" returns to the series.
 Key:  = "Cast member" does not feature in this episode.
 Key:  = "Cast member" is not a cast member in this episode.

Episodes

References 

2019 Polish television seasons
Series 11